Grahame Moran is a former professional rugby league footballer who played his entire first-grade career for the National Rugby League club Penrith Panthers with whom he was the 14th player.

Playing career
Moran was originally from the New South Wales town of Taree and his preferred position was  but also played . Before joining the Panthers in its inaugural 1967 season, Moran played for a combined country team and in 1968, represented city seconds thus becoming the first Penrith player to play representative football.

Moran's career statistics were: 121 first grade games, 25 tries, 4 goals for 83 career points.

Accolades
In 2006, Moran was selected as centre alongside Ryan Girdler in the Panthers' 40th anniversary team of legends.

On 25 June 2016, Moran was inducted into the Penrith Panthers hall of fame alongside Royce Simmons, Craig Gower and Greg Alexander.

References

Living people
Australian rugby league players
Country New South Wales rugby league team players
New South Wales rugby league team players
Penrith Panthers players
Rugby league centres
Rugby league five-eighths
Rugby league players from Taree
Year of birth missing (living people)